The 2014 Grand Prix Zagreb Open, was a wrestling event held in Zagreb, Croatia between 8–9 February 2014.

Medal table

Team ranking

Greco-Roman

Participating nations

57 competitors from 7 nations participated.
 (2)
 (20)
 (8)
 (3)
 (15)
 (5)
 (2)
 (2)

References 

Grand Prix Zagreb Open
Grand Prix Zagreb Open
International wrestling competitions hosted by Croatia
Sport in Zagreb
Wrestling in Croatia
Grand Prix Zagreb Open